{{Infobox basketball biography
| name = Matt Guokas
| image = Matt Guokas and Wilt Chamberlain.jpg
| width =
| caption = Guokas defending against Wilt Chamberlain, 1971
| birth_date = 
| birth_place = Philadelphia, Pennsylvania, U.S.
| death_date = 
| death_place = 
| height_ft = 6
| height_in = 5
| weight_lb = 175
| high_school = Saint Joseph's Prep(Philadelphia, Pennsylvania)
| college = Saint Joseph's (1964–1966)
| draft_year = 1966
| draft_round = 1
| draft_pick = 9
| draft_team = Philadelphia 76ers
| career_start = 1966
| career_end = 1976
| career_position = Shooting guard / Small forward
| career_number = 14, 24, 11, 4, 10
| years1 = –
| team1 = Philadelphia 76ers
| years2 = 
| team2 = Chicago Bulls
| years3 = –
| team3 = Cincinnati Royals / Kansas City-Omaha Kings
| years4 = 
| team4 = Houston Rockets
| years5 = 
| team5 = Buffalo Braves
| years6 = –
| team6 = Chicago Bulls
| years7 = 
| team7 = Kansas City Kings
| cyears1 = –
| cteam1 = Philadelphia 76ers (assistant)
| cyears2 = –
| cteam2 = Philadelphia 76ers
| cyears3 = –
| cteam3 = Orlando Magic
| highlights = 
As player:
 NBA champion (1967)
 Consensus second-team All-American (1966)
As assistant coach:
 NBA champion (1983)
| stat1label = Points
| stat1value = 4,285 (5.8 ppg)
| stat2label = Rebounds
| stat2value = 1,446 (2.0 rpg)
| stat3label = Assists
| stat3value = 2,174 (3.0 apg)
| bbr = guokama02
}}Matthew George Guokas Jr.' (born February 25, 1944) is an American former professional basketball player and coach. His father, Matt Sr. and uncle, Al, have also played in the NBA.

Guokas and his father, Matt Sr., were the first father-son duo to both win NBA championships as players; this feat has since been repeated by the Barrys (Rick and Brent), the Waltons (Bill and Luke), the Thompsons (Mychal and Klay), and the Paytons (Gary Payton and Gary Payton II).

Biography

Playing career
Guokas played college basketball for hometown Saint Joseph's University, where he set many school records in assists and steals. He was an All-American as a junior in 1966, and graduated in 1967. After SJU, Guokas was selected in the first round by the Philadelphia 76ers team and played for the team featuring Wilt Chamberlain, Hal Greer, Chet Walker and Billy Cunningham that ended the eight-year championship streak of the Boston Celtics. He also played with the Buffalo Braves, Chicago Bulls, Cincinnati Royals, Houston Rockets, and Kansas City Kings, all of the NBA. In the 1972–73 season, Guokas finished second (to Chamberlain) in the NBA in field goal percentage with a .570 clip during that season.

Coaching and broadcasting
Guokas later returned to the Sixers as an assistant coach under Billy Cunningham, and was named head coach when Cunningham retired in 1985. He led the Sixers to two second-place finishes, but was fired after a slow start to the 1987–88 season. 

After a year away from the game, he served as the first coach of the Orlando Magic, steering the team through its first four years, the last of which saw the Magic come within one game of making the playoffs in Shaquille O'Neal's rookie year. He compiled a combined 230–305 career record in parts of seven seasons.

He formerly worked as a TV color commentator and sports analyst for the Magic on Fox Sports Florida and Sun Sports cable channels, teaming with veteran NBA and college sportscaster David Steele. He also served as a color commentator for NBA on NBC broadcasts during the 1990s and was a color commentator for the Cleveland Cavaliers for Fox Sports Ohio'' cable channel for a number of years in the late 1990s and early 2000s.

Head coaching record

|-
| style="text-align:left;"|Philadelphia
| style="text-align:left;"|
| 82||54||28|||| style="text-align:center;"|2nd in Atlantic||12||6||6||
| style="text-align:center;"|Lost in Conference Semifinals
|-
| style="text-align:left;"|Philadelphia
| style="text-align:left;"|
| 82||45||37|||| style="text-align:center;"|2nd in Atlantic||5||2||3||
| style="text-align:center;"|Lost in First Round
|-
| style="text-align:left;"|Philadelphia
| style="text-align:left;"|
| 43||20||23|||| style="text-align:center;"|(fired)||—||—||—||—
| style="text-align:center;"|—
|-
| style="text-align:left;"|Orlando
| style="text-align:left;"|
| 82||18||64|||| style="text-align:center;"|7th in Central||—||—||—||—
| style="text-align:center;"|Missed playoffs
|-
| style="text-align:left;"|Orlando
| style="text-align:left;"|
| 82||31||51|||| style="text-align:center;"|4th in Midwest||—||—||—||—
| style="text-align:center;"|Missed playoffs
|-
| style="text-align:left;"|Orlando
| style="text-align:left;"|
| 82||21||61|||| style="text-align:center;"|7th in Atlantic||—||—||—||—
| style="text-align:center;"|Missed playoffs
|-
| style="text-align:left;"|Orlando
| style="text-align:left;"|
| 82||41||41|||| style="text-align:center;"|4th in Atlantic||—||—||—||—
| style="text-align:center;"|Missed playoffs
|- class="sortbottom"
| style="text-align:center;" colspan="2"|Career
| 535||230||305|||| ||17||8||9||||

Personal life
Guokas's father (Matt Sr.), uncle (Al) and son (Matt III) have all played for Saint Joseph's University.

References

External links

1944 births
Living people
All-American college men's basketball players
American men's basketball players
American people of Lithuanian descent
Basketball coaches from Pennsylvania
Basketball players from Philadelphia
Buffalo Braves players
Chicago Bulls players
Cincinnati Royals players
College basketball announcers in the United States
Houston Rockets players
Kansas City Kings players
National Basketball Association broadcasters
Orlando Magic head coaches
Philadelphia 76ers assistant coaches
Philadelphia 76ers draft picks
Philadelphia 76ers head coaches
Philadelphia 76ers players
Saint Joseph's Hawks men's basketball players
Shooting guards
Small forwards
St. Joseph's Preparatory School alumni